Leib is a given name, and (less often) a surname usually of Jewish origin. Leib often stems from לייב (leib), the Yiddish word for "lion". The Standard German word for lion is Löwe; other – partly dialectal – German forms of the word are Löw, Loew, Löb, Leb and Leib. In Standard German, Leib means "body", but that is in general not the source for the Yiddish name. Leib may also be connected to the Hebrew word לב (lev, leb), meaning "heart".

Given name
Yehudah Aryeh Leib Alter (1847–1905), Polish rabbi
Aryeh Leib ben Asher Gunzberg (c. 1695–1785), Lithuanian rabbi and author
Aryeh Leib Dulchin (Arieh Dulzin, 1913–1989) Soviet and Israeli Zionist activist and politician
Aryeh Leib Epstein (1708–1775), Polish rabbi
Yaakov Yehuda Aryeh Leib Frenkel (died 1940), Hungarian rabbi
Aryeh Leib Frumkin (1845–1916), Lithuanian rabbi
Isaac Leib Goldberg (1860–1935), Lithuanian-Israeli Zionist leader and philanthropist
Leib Gurwicz (1906–1982), Lithuanian-British rabbi
Aryeh Leib HaCohen Heller (1745–1812), Polish rabbi
Leib Kvitko (1890–1952), Soviet poet
Leib Langfus (died 1944), Polish rabbi and Auschwitz victim
Yehuda Leib Maimon (1875–1962), Israeli rabbi
Aryeh Leib Malin (1906–1962), Polish-American rabbi
Leib Milstein (Lewis Milestone, 1895–1980), Moldovan-American film director
Aryeh Leib ben Moses Zuenz (c. 1768–1833), Polish rabbi
Leib Ostrow (born 1951), American music producer
Yehudah Leib Pinsker (Leon Pinsker, 1821–1891), Polish political activist and physician
Leib Sarah's (Aryeh Leib the son of Sarah, 1730–1796), rabbi
Aryeh Leib ben Saul (c. 1690–1755), Polish rabbi
Aryeh Leib Schochet (1845–1928), Russian-American rabbi
Aharon Yehuda Leib Shteinman (1913–2017), Israeli rabbi
Zalman Leib Teitelbaum (born 1951), American rabbi
Leib Tropper (born 1950), American rabbi
Leib Weissberg (1893–1942), Croatian rabbi
Leib Yaffe (died 1948), Israeli poet and journalist
Aryeh Leib Yellin (1820–1886), Polish rabbi

Surname
Ethan Leib (born 1975), American law professor
Gary Leib (1955–2021), American cartoonist and animator
Michael Leib (1760–1822), American politician

See also
Loeb (surname)
Leibowitz

References 

Given names
Surnames